The 1952 season was Dinamo București's fourth season in Divizia A. Dinamo came again close to their first championship in history, but finished only on second position with 34 points, two points behind champion CCA. Dinamo has not lost any match at home and was the only team to defeat the champions the entire season. Titus Ozon became the first scorer of the tournament in Dinamo's history with 17 goals this season. They also appeared in the semifinals of the Cupa României, and lost to eventual winners CCA.

Due to extremely long break (May to August) created by two national team matches and preparation for participation in the Olympic Games, a part of Dinamo's players were part in this period of a team who participated in the Nations Cup.

Results

Squad 

Standard team: Constantin Constantinescu (Iosif Fuleiter) – Constantin Marinescu, Ladislau Băcuț (Florian Ambru), Anton Fodor – Gheorghe Băcuț, Valeriu Călinoiu (Viliam Florescu) – Justin Zehan, Carol Bartha (Iosif Lutz), Ion Suru, Nicolae Dumitru, Titus Ozon (Alexandru Ene).

Transferuri 

Titus Ozon came back to Dinamo, after a year spent at Dinamo Oraşul Stalin. Some of the new players brought by coach Iuliu Baratky were goalkeeper Constantin Constantinescu (also from Dinamo Oraşul Stalin), Ladislau Băcuț (Flamura Roşie Arad), Anton Fodor (Locomotiva Timişoara) and Dumitru Ignat (Dinamo Oraşul Stalin).

References 
 www.labtof.ro
 www.romaniansoccer.ro

1952
Association football clubs 1952 season
1951–52 in Romanian football
1952–53 in Romanian football